The men's tournament of the 2018 New Holland Canadian Junior Curling Championships was held from January 13 to 21 at the Aréna Grand-Mère and the Centre municipal de curling de Shawinigan.

Teams
The teams are listed as follows:

Round-robin standings
Final round-robin standings

Round-robin results
All draw times are listed in Eastern Standard Time (UTC−5:00).

Pool A

Draw 1
Saturday, January 13, 09:30

Draw 2
Saturday, January 13, 14:00

Draw 3
Saturday, January 13, 19:30

Draw 4
Sunday, January 14, 09:30

Draw 5
Sunday, January 14, 14:00

Draw 6
Sunday, January 14, 18:30

Draw 7
Monday, January 15, 09:30

Draw 8
Monday, January 15, 14:00

Draw 9
Monday, January 15, 18:30

Draw 10
Tuesday, January 16, 09:30

Draw 11
Tuesday, January 16, 14:00

Draw 12
Tuesday, January 16, 18:30

Pool B

Draw 1
Saturday, January 13, 09:30

Draw 2
Saturday, January 13, 14:00

Draw 3
Saturday, January 13, 19:30

Draw 4
Sunday, January 14, 09:30

Draw 5
Sunday, January 14, 14:00

Draw 6
Sunday, January 14, 18:30

Draw 7
Monday, January 15, 09:30

Draw 8
Monday, January 15, 14:00

Draw 9
Monday, January 15, 18:30

Draw 10
Tuesday, January 16, 09:30

Draw 11
Tuesday, January 16, 14:00

Draw 12
Tuesday, January 16, 18:30

Placement Round

Seeding Pool

Standings
Final round-robin standings

Draw 13
Wednesday, January 17, 14:00

Draw 14
Wednesday, January 17, 18:30

Draw 15
Thursday, January 18, 09:30

Draw 16
Thursday, January 18, 14:00

Draw 17
Thursday, January 18, 18:30

Draw 19
Friday, January 19, 13:00

Championship Pool

Championship Pool Standings
Final round-robin standings

Draw 13
Wednesday, January 17, 14:00

Draw 14
Wednesday, January 17, 18:30

Draw 15
Thursday, January 18, 09:30

Draw 16
Thursday, January 18, 14:00

Draw 17
Thursday, January 18, 18:30

Draw 18
Friday, January 19, 09:00

Tiebreakers
Friday, January 19, 13:30

Playoffs

Semifinal
Saturday, January 20, 18:00

Final
Sunday, January 21, 18:00

References

External links

Junior Championships
Canadian Junior Curling Championships, 2018
Canadian Junior Curling Championships
Canadian Junior Curling
Shawinigan